Stairs are a structure designed to bridge a large vertical distance between lower and higher levels by dividing it into smaller vertical distances. This is achieved as a diagonal series of horizontal platforms called steps which enable passage to the other level by stepping from one to another step in turn. Steps are very typically rectangular. Stairs may be straight, round, or may consist of two or more straight pieces connected at angles.

Types of stairs include staircases (also called stairways), ladders, and escalators. Some alternatives to stairs are elevators (also called lifts), stairlifts, inclined moving walkways, and ramps. A stairwell is a vertical shaft or opening that contains a staircase. A flight (of stairs) is an inclined part of a staircase consisting of steps (and their lateral supports if supports are separate from steps).

Components and terms

A stair, or a stairstep, is one step in a flight of stairs.  In buildings, stairs is a term applied to a complete flight of steps between two floors.  A stair flight is a run of stairs or steps between landings.  A staircase or stairway is one or more flights of stairs leading from one floor to another, and includes landings, newel posts, handrails, balustrades and additional parts. A stairwell is a compartment extending vertically through a building in which stairs are placed.  A stair hall is the stairs, landings, hallways, or other portions of the public hall through which it is necessary to pass when going from the entrance floor to the other floors of a building.  Box stairs are stairs built between walls, usually with no support except the wall strings.

Stairs may be in a "straight run", leading from one floor to another without a turn or change in direction. Stairs may change direction, commonly by two straight flights connected at a 90 degree angle landing. Stairs may also return onto themselves with 180 degree angle landings at each end of straight flights forming a vertical stairway commonly used in multistory and highrise buildings. Many variations of geometrical stairs may be formed of circular, elliptical and irregular constructions.

Stairs may be a required component of egress from structures and buildings. Stairs are also provided for convenience to access floors, roofs, levels and walking surfaces not accessible by other means.  Stairs may also be a fanciful physical construct such as the "stairs that go nowhere" located at the Winchester Mystery House.  Stairs are also a subject used in art to represent real or imaginary places built around impossible objects using geometric distortion, as in the work of artist M. C. Escher.

"Stairway" is also a common metaphor for achievement or loss of a position in the society; or as a metaphor of hierarchy (e.g. Jacob's Ladder, Battleship Potemkin).

Step

Each step is composed of a tread and a riser. Some include nosing.

 Tread: The part of the stairway that is stepped on. It is constructed to the same specifications (thickness) as any other flooring. The tread "depth" is measured from the back of one tread to the back of the next. The "width" is measured from one side to the other.
 Riser: the near-vertical element in a set of stairs, forming the space between one step and the next. It is sometimes slightly inclined from the vertical so that its top is closer than its base to the person climbing the stairs.
 Nosing: An edge part of the tread that protrudes over the riser beneath. If it is present, this means that, measured horizontally, the total "run" length of the stairs is not simply the sum of the tread lengths, as the treads overlap each other. Many building codes require stair nosings for commercial, industrial, or municipal stairs. They provide additional length to the tread without changing the pitch of the stairs.
 Starting or feature tread: Where stairs are open on one or both sides, the first step above the lower floor or landing may be wider than the other steps and rounded. When the starting step is rounded, the balusters typically form a spiral around the circumference of the rounded portion, and the handrail has a spiral called a "volute" that supports the top of the balusters. Besides the cosmetic appeal, starting steps allow the balusters to form a wider, more stable base for the end of the handrail. Handrails that simply end at a post at the foot of the stairs can be less sturdy, even with a thick post. A double ended feature tread can be used when both sides of the stairs are open. There are a number of different styles and uses of feature tread.
 Stringer board, stringer, or sometimes just string: The structural member that supports the treads and risers in standard staircases. There are typically three stringers, one on either side and one in the centre, with more added as necessary for wider spans. Side stringers are sometimes dadoed to receive risers and treads for increased support. Stringers on open-sided stairs are called "cut stringers".
 Tread rise: The distance from the top of one tread to the top of the next tread.
 Total rise: The distance the flight of stairs raises vertically between two finished floor levels.
  Winders: Winders are steps that are narrower on one side than the other. They are used to change the direction of the stairs without landings. A series of winders form a circular or spiral stairway. When three steps are used to turn a 90° corner, the middle step is called a kite winder as a kite-shaped quadrilateral.
 Trim: Various moldings are used to decorate and in some instances support stairway elements. Scotia or quarter-round are typically placed beneath the nosing to support its overhang.

Curtail step 
A decorative step at the bottom of the staircase which usually houses the volute and volute newel turning for a continuous handrail. The curtail tread will follow the flow of the volute.

The railing system

The balustrade is the system of railings and balusters that prevents people from falling over the edge.
 Banister, railing, or handrail: The angled member for handholding, as distinguished from the vertical balusters which hold it up for stairs that are open on one side. Railings are often present on both sides of stairs, but can sometimes be only on one side or absent altogether. On wide staircases, there can be one or more railings in between the two sides. The term "banister" is sometimes used to mean just the handrail, sometimes the handrail and the balusters, or sometimes just the balusters.
 Volute: A handrail end element for the bullnose step that curves inward like a spiral. A volute is said to be right or left-handed depending on which side of the stairs the handrail is as one faces up the stairs.
 Turnout: Instead of a complete spiral volute, a turnout deviates from the normal handrail centre line away from the flight to give a wider opening as one enters the staircase, The turnout is usually set over a newel post to give added stability to the handrail.
 Gooseneck: The vertical handrail that joins a sloped handrail to a higher handrail on the balcony or landing is a gooseneck.
 Rosette: Where the handrail ends in the wall and a half-newel is not used, it may be trimmed by a rosette.
 Easings: Wall handrails are mounted directly onto the wall with wall brackets. At the bottom of the stairs such railings flare to a horizontal railing and this horizontal portion is called a "starting easing". At the top of the stairs, the horizontal portion of the railing is called an "over easing".
 Core rail: Wood handrails often have a metal core to provide extra strength and stiffness, especially when the rail has to curve against the grain of the wood. The archaic term for the metal core is "core rail".
 Baluster: A term for the vertical posts that hold up the handrail. Sometimes simply called guards or spindles. Treads often require two balusters. The second baluster is closer to the riser and is taller than the first. The extra height in the second baluster is typically in the middle between decorative elements on the baluster. That way the bottom decorative elements are aligned with the tread and the top elements are aligned with the railing angle.

 Newel: A large baluster or post used to anchor the handrail. Since it is a structural element, it extends below the floor and subfloor to the bottom of the floor joists and is bolted right to the floor joist. A half-newel may be used where a railing ends in the wall. Visually, it looks like half the newel is embedded in the wall. For open landings, a newel may extend below the landing for a decorative newel drop.
 Finial: A decorative cap to the top of a newel post, particularly at the end of the balustrade.
Baserail, or shoerail: For systems where the baluster does not start at the treads, they go to a baserail. This allows for identical balusters, avoiding the second baluster problem.
 Fillet: A decorative filler piece on the floor between balusters on a balcony railing.

Handrails may be continuous (sometimes called over-the-post) or post-to-post (or more accurately newel-to-newel). For continuous handrails on long balconies, there may be multiple newels and tandem caps to cover the newels. At corners, there are quarter-turn caps. For post-to-post systems, the newels project above the handrails.

Another, more classical, form of handrailing which is still in use is the tangent method. A variant of the Cylindric method of layout, it allows for continuous climbing and twisting rails and easings. It was defined from principles set down by architect Peter Nicholson in the 18th century.

The earliest spiral staircases appear in Temple A in the Greek colony Selinunte, Sicily, to both sides of the cella. The temple was constructed around 480–470 BC.

Other terms 

Apron This is a wooden fascia board used to cover up trimmers and joists exposed by stairwell openings. The apron may be moulded or plain, and is intended to give the staircase a cleaner look by cloaking the side view.
 Balcony: For stairs with an open concept upper floor or landing, the upper floor is functionally a balcony. For a straight flight of stairs, the balcony may be long enough to require multiple newels to support the length of railing.
 Flight: Any uninterrupted series of steps between floors or levels.
 Floating stairs: A flight of stairs is said to be "floating" if there is nothing underneath. The risers are typically missing as well to emphasize the open effect, and create a functional feature suspended in midair. There may be only one stringer or the stringers otherwise minimized. Where building codes allow, there may not even be handrails.
 Landing, or platform: A landing is the area of a floor near the top or bottom step of a stair. An intermediate landing is a small platform that is built as part of stairs between main floor levels and is typically used to allow the stairs to change directions, or to allow the user a rest. A half landing, or half-pace, is where a 180° change in direction is made, and a quarter landing is where a 90° change in direction is made (on an intermediate landing). As intermediate landings consume floor space, they can be expensive to build. However, changing the direction of the stairs allows stairs to fit where they would not otherwise, or provides privacy to the upper level as visitors downstairs cannot simply look up the stairs to the upper level due to the change in direction. The word 'landing' is also commonly used for a general corridor in any of the floors above the ground floor of a building, even if that corridor is located well away from a staircase.
 Mobile safety steps: Can be used as temporary, safe replacements for many types of stairs
 Runner: Carpeting that runs down the middle of the stairs. Runners may be directly stapled or nailed to the stairs, or may be secured by a specialized bar, known as a stair rod, that holds the carpet in place where the tread meets the riser.
 Spandrel: If there is not another flight of stairs immediately underneath, the triangular space underneath the stairs is called a "spandrel". It is frequently used as a closet.
 Staircase: This term is often reserved for the stairs themselves: the steps, railings and landings; though often it is used interchangeably with "stairs" and "stairway". In the UK, however, the term "staircase" denotes what in the U.S. is called "stairway", but usually includes the casing – the walls, bannisters and underside of the stairs or roof above.
 Stairway: This primarily American term is often reserved for the entire stairwell and staircase in combination; though often it is used interchangeably with "stairs" and "staircase".
 Stairwell: The spatial opening, usually a vertical shaft, containing an indoor stairway; by extension it is often used as including the stairs it contains.
Staircase tower: A tower attached to, or incorporated into, a building that contains stairs linking the various floors.

Measurements
The measurements of a stair, in particular the rise height and going of the steps, should remain the same along the stairs.

The following stair measurements are important:
 The rise height or rise of each step is measured from the top of one tread to the next. It is not the physical height of the riser; the latter excludes the thickness of the tread. A person using the stairs would move this distance vertically for each step taken.
 The tread depth of a step is measured from the edge of the nosing to the vertical riser; if the steps have no nosing, it is the same as the going; otherwise it is the going plus the extent of one nosing.
 The going of a step is measured from the edge of the nosing to the edge of nosing in plan view. A person using the stairs would move this distance forward with each step they take.
 To avoid confusion, the number of steps in a set of stairs is always the number of risers, not the number of treads.
 The total run or total going of the stairs is the horizontal distance from the first riser to the last riser. It is often not simply the sum of the individual tread lengths due to the nosing overlapping between treads. If there are N steps, the total run equals N-1 times the going: the tread of the first step is part of a landing.
 The total rise of the stairs is the height between floors (or landings) that the flight of stairs is spanning. If there are N steps, the total rise equals N times the rise of each step.

 The slope or pitch of the stairs is the ratio between the rise and the going (not the tread depth, due to the nosing). It is sometimes called the rake of the stairs. The pitch line is the imaginary line along the tip of the nosing of the treads. In the UK, stair pitch is the angle the pitch line makes with the horizontal, measured in degrees. The value of the slope, as a ratio, is then the tangent of the pitch angle.
 Headroom is the height above the nosing of a tread to the ceiling above it.
 Walkline – for curved stairs, the inner radius of the curve may result in very narrow treads. The "walkline" is the imaginary line some distance away from the inner edge on which people are expected to walk. Building code will specify the distance. Building codes will then specify the minimum tread size at the walkline.

Forms

Stairs can take a large number of forms, combining winders and landings.

The simplest form is the straight flight of stairs, with neither winders nor landings. These types of stairs were commonly used in traditional homes as they are relatively easy to build and only need to be connected at the top and bottom; however, many modern properties may not choose straight flights of stairs because:
 the upstairs is directly visible from the bottom of a straight flight of stairs.
 it is potentially more dangerous in that a fall is not interrupted until the bottom of the stairs.
 a straight flight requires enough space for the entire run of the stairs.

Another form of straight staircase is the space saver staircase, also known as paddle stairs or alternating tread staircases, that can be used for a steeper rise, but these can only be used in certain circumstances and must comply with regulations.

However, a basic straight flight of stairs is easier to design and construct than one with landings or winders. Although the rhythm of stepping is not interrupted in a straight run, which may offset the increased fall risk by helping to prevent a misstep in the first place, many stairs will require landings or winders to comply with safety standards in the Building Regulations.

Straight stairs can have a mid-landing incorporated, but it is probably more common to see stairs that use a landing or winder to produce a bend in the stairs as a straight flight with a mid-landing will require a lot of linear space and is more commonly found in commercial buildings. "L" shaped stairways have one landing and usually change in direction by 90 degrees. "U" shaped stairs may employ a single wider landing for a change in direction of 180 degrees, or two landings for two changes in direction of 90 degrees each. A Z-shaped staircase incorporates two parallel 90° turns, creating a shape similar to that of the letter ‘Z’ if seen from above. Use of landings and a possible change of direction have the following effects:
 The upstairs is not directly visible from the bottom of the stairs, which can provide more privacy for the upper floor.
 A fall can be halted at the landing point, reducing the distance someone would fall to reduce risks.
 Though the landings consume total floor space, there is no requirement for a large single dimension, allowing more flexible floorplan designs.
 For larger stairs, particularly in exterior applications, a landing can provide a place to rest the legs.

Other forms include stairs with winders that curve or bend at an acute angle, three flight stairs that join at a landing to form a T-shape, and stairs with balconies and complex designs can be produced to suit individual properties.

A mono string staircase is a term used for a steel spine staircase with treads.

A double string staircase has two steel beams on either side and treads in the center.

Spiral and helical stairs
 

Spiral stairs, sometimes referred to in architectural descriptions as vice, wind around a newel (also the central pole). In Scottish architecture, they are commonly known as a turnpike stair. They typically have a handrail on the outer side only, and on the inner side just the central pole. A squared spiral stair assumes a square stairwell and expands the steps and railing to a square, resulting in unequal steps (larger where they extend into a corner of the square). A pure spiral assumes a circular stairwell and the steps and handrail are equal and positioned screw-symmetrically. A tight spiral stair with a central pole is very space efficient in the use of floor area.

Spiral stairs have the disadvantage of being very steep if they are tight or are otherwise not supported by a centre column, for two reasons:
 The wider the spiral, the more steps can be accommodated per spiral. Therefore, if the spiral is large in diameter, via having a central support column that is strong (invariably large in diameter) and a special handrail that helps to distribute the load, each step may be longer and therefore the rise between each step may be smaller (equal to that of regular steps). Otherwise, the circumference of the circle at the walk line will be so small that it will be impossible to maintain a normal tread depth and a normal rise height without compromising headroom before reaching the upper floor.
 To maintain headroom, some spiral stairs have very high rises to support a very short diameter. These are typically cases where the stairwell must be a small diameter by design or must not have any center support by design or may not have any perimeter support.

An example of perimeter support is the Vatican stairwell or the gothic stairwell. That stairwell is only tight because of its design in which the diameter must be small. Many spirals, however, have sufficient width for normal size treads (8 inches) by being supported by any combination of a center pole, perimeter supports attaching to or beneath the treads, and a helical handrail.  In this manner, the treads may be wide enough to accommodate low rises. In self-supporting stairs the spiral needs to be steep to allow the weight to distribute safely down the spiral in the most vertical manner possible. Spiral steps with centre columns or perimeter support do not have this limitation. Building codes may limit the use of spiral stairs to small areas or secondary usage if their treads are not sufficiently wide or have risers above nine and a half inches.

The term "spiral" has a more narrow definition in a mathematical context, as a mathematical spiral lies in a single plane and moves towards or away from a central point. The mathematical term for motion where the locus remains at a fixed distance from a fixed line whilst moving in a circular motion about it is "helical". The presence or otherwise of a central pole does not affect the terminology applied to the design of the structure.

When used in Roman architecture spiral stairs were generally restricted to elite structures. They were then adopted into Christian ecclesiastic architecture. There is a common misconception that spiral staircases in castles rose in a clockwise direction to hinder right-handed attackers. While clockwise spiral staircases are more common in castles than anti-clockwise, they were even more common in medieval structures without a military role such as religious buildings. Studies of spiral stairs in castle have concluded that "the role and position of spirals in castles ... had a much stronger domestic and status role than a military function" and that "there are sufficient examples of anticlockwise stairs in Britain and France in [the 11th and 12th centuries] to indicate that the choice must have depended both on physical convenience and architectural practicalities and there was no military ideology that demanded clockwise staircases in the cause of fighting efficiency or advantage".

Developments in manufacturing and design have led to the introduction of kit form spiral stairs. Steps and handrails can be bolted together to form a complete unit. These stairs can be made out of steel, timber, concrete or a combination of materials.

Helical or circular stairs do not have a central pole and there is a handrail on both sides. These have the advantage of a more uniform tread width when compared to the spiral staircase. Such stairs may also be built around an elliptical or oval platform.

Both double spiral and double helix staircases are possible, with two independent helical stairs in the same vertical space, allowing one person to ascend and another to descend, without ever meeting if they choose different helices. For examples, the Pozzo di San Patrizio allows one-way traffic so that laden and unladen mules can ascend and descend without obstruction, while Château de Chambord, Château de Blois, and the Crédit Lyonnais headquarters ensure separation for social purposes. Fire escapes, though built with landings and straight runs of stairs, are often functionally double helices, with two separate stairs intertwined and occupying the same floor space. This is often in support of legal requirements to have two separate fire escapes.

Both spiral and helical stairs can be characterized by the number of turns that are made. A "quarter-turn" stair deposits the person facing 90 degrees from the starting orientation. Likewise, there are half-turn, three-quarters-turn and full-turn stairs. A continuous spiral may make many turns depending on the height. Very tall multi-turn spiral staircases are usually found in old stone towers within fortifications, churches and in lighthouses.

Winders may be used in combination with straight stairs to turn the direction of the stairs. This allows for a large number of permutations.

Alternating tread stairs or 'Witches stairs'

Where there is insufficient space for the full run length of normal stairs, alternating tread stairs may be used. Alternating tread stairs allow for a safe forward-facing descent of very steep stairs. The treads are designed such that they alternate between treads for each foot: one step is wide on the left side; the next step is wide on the right side. There is insufficient space on the narrow portion of the step for the other foot to stand, hence the person must always use the correct foot on the correct step. The slope of alternating tread stairs can be as high as 65 degrees as opposed to standard stairs, which are almost always less than 45 degrees. The advantage of alternating tread stairs is that people can descend face forward. The only other alternative in such short spaces would be a ladder which requires backward-facing descent. Alternating tread stairs may not be safe for small children, the elderly or the physically challenged. Building codes typically classify them as ladders and will only allow them where ladders are allowed, usually basement or attic utility or storage areas not frequently accessed.

These stairs are nowadays commonly referred to as 'Witches stairs', in the belief that they were created during an earlier era in an attempt to repel witches who were thought to be unable to climb such stairs. Such an origin of the term has since been disproved however, with experts finding no mention in any historical literature of stairs that were believed to prevent access by witches.

Alternating tread stairs have been in use since at least 1888.

The blocks-model in the image illustrates the space efficiency gained by an alternating tread stair. The alternating stairs (3) requires one unit of space per step: the same as the half-width stairs (2), and half as much as the full-width stairs (1). Thus, the horizontal distance between steps is in this case reduced by a factor of two, reducing the size of each step.

The horizontal distance between steps is reduced by a factor less than two if for construction reasons there are narrow "unused" steps.

There is often (here also) glide plane symmetry: the mirror image with respect to the vertical center plane corresponds to a shift by one step.

Ergonomics and building code requirements

Ergonomically and for safety reasons, stairs must have certain measurements so that people can comfortably use them. Building codes typically specify certain measurements so that the stairs are not too steep or narrow.

Nicolas-François Blondel in the last volume of his Cours d'architecture (1675–1683) was the first known person to establish the ergonomic relationship of tread and riser dimensions. He specified that 2 × riser + tread = step length.

It is estimated that a noticeable misstep occurs once in 7,398 uses and a minor accident on a flight of stairs occurs once in 63,000 uses. Stairs can be a hazardous obstacle for some, so some people choose to live in residences without stairs so that they are protected from injury.

Stairs are not suitable for wheelchairs and other vehicles. A stairlift is a mechanical device for lifting wheelchairs up and down stairs. For sufficiently wide stairs, a rail is mounted to the treads of the stairs, or attached to the wall. A chair is attached to the rail and the person on the chair is lifted as the chair moves along the rail.

UK requirements

(overview of Approved document K – Stairs, Ladders and Ramps)

The 2013 edition "approved document K" categorises stairs as private, utility and general access

When considering stairs for private dwellings all the specified measurements are in millimetres.

Building regulations are required for stairs used where the difference of level is greater than 600

Steepness of stairs – rise and going

Any rise between 150 and 220 used with any going between 220 and 300

Maximum rise 220 and minimum going 220 remembering that the maximum pitch of private stairs is 42°. The normal relationship between dimensions of the rise and going is that twice the rise plus the going (2R + G) should be between 550 and 700

Construction of steps

Steps should have level treads, they may have open risers but if so treads should overlap at least 16mm. Domestic private stairs are likely to be used by children under 5 years old so the handrail ballister spacing should be constructed so that a 100mm diameter sphere cannot pass through the opening in the risers in order to prevent children from sticking their heads through them and potentially getting stuck.

Headroom

A headroom of 2000mm is adequate. Special considerations can be made for loft conversions.

Width of flights

No recommendations are given for stair widths.

Length of flights

The approved document refers to 16 risers (steps) for utility stairs and 12 for general access. There is no requirement for private stairs. In practice there will be fewer than 16 steps as 16 x 220 gives over 3500 total rise (storey height) which is way above that in a domestic situation.

Landings

Level, unobstructed landings should be provided at the top and bottom of every flight. The width and length being at least that of the width of the stairs and can include part of the floor. A door may swing across the landing at the bottom of the flight but must leave a clear space of at least 400 across the whole landing

Tapered steps

There are special rules for stairs with tapered steps as shown in the image Example of Winder Stairs above

Alternate tread stairs can be provide in space saving situations

Guarding

Flights and landings must be guarded at the sides where the drop is more than 600mm. As domestic private stairs are likely to be used by children under 5 the guarding must be constructed so that a 100mm diameter sphere cannot pass through any opening or constructed so that children will not be able to climb the guarding. The height for internal private stairs should be at least  and be able to withstand a horizontal force of 0.36|kN/m|.

US requirements
American building codes, while varying from State to State and County to County, generally specify the following parameters:
 Minimum tread length, typically  excluding the nosing for private residences. Some building codes also specify a minimum riser height, often .
 Riser-Tread formula: Sometimes the stair parameters will be something like riser plus tread equals ; another formula is 2 times riser + tread equals , the length of a stride. Thus a  rise and a  tread exactly meets this code. If only a  rise is used then a  tread is required. This is based on the principle that a low rise is more like walking up a gentle incline and so the natural swing of the leg will be longer.
 Low rise stairs are very expensive in terms of the space consumed. Such low rise stairs were built into the Winchester Mystery House to accommodate the infirmities of the owner, Sarah Winchester, before the invention of the elevator. These stairways, called "Easy Risers" consist of five flights wrapped into a multi-turn arrangement with a total width equal to more than four times the individual flight width and a depth roughly equal to one flight's run plus this width. The flights have varying numbers of steps.
 Slope: A value for the rise-to-tread ratio of 17/29 ˜ 0.59 is considered optimal; this corresponds to a pitch angle of about 30°.
 Variance on riser height and tread depth between steps on the same flight should be very low. The reason is that on a continuous flight of stairs, people get used to a regular step and may trip if there is a step that is different, especially at night. The general rule is that all steps on the same flight must be identical. Hence, stairs are typically custom made to fit the particular floor to floor height and horizontal space available. Special care must be taken on the first and last risers. Stairs must be supported directly by the subfloor. If thick flooring (e.g. thick hardwood planks) are added on top of the subfloor, it will cover part of the first riser, reducing the effective height of the first step. Likewise at the top step, if the top riser simply reaches the subfloor and thick flooring is added, the last rise at the top may be higher than the last riser. The first and last riser heights of the rough stairs are modified to adjust for the addition of the finished floor.
 Maximum nosing protrusion, typically  to prevent people from tripping on the nosing.
 Height of the handrail. The minimum height of the handrail for landings may be different and is typically .
 Handrail diameter.
 Maximum space between the balusters of the handrail. This is typically .
 Headroom: At least .
 Maximum vertical height between floors or landings. This allows people to rest and limits the height of a fall.
 Mandate handrails if there is more than a certain number of steps (typically 2 risers).
 Minimum width of the stairway, with and without handrails.
 Not allow doors to swing over steps; the arc of doors must be completely on the landing/floor.
 A stairwell may be designated as an area of refuge as well as a fire escape route, due to its fire-resistance rated design and fresh air supply.
 The American Disabilities Act and other accessibility standards by state, such as Architectural Barriers Texas Accessibility Standards (TAS), do not allow open risers on accessible or egress stairs.

Stairs and art

As much as stairs are very functional, stairs can be very decorative and an impressive part of a building. Especially at the entrance of a large building stairs play an important role in the first impression of a building. In large buildings such as banks this is very popular. Modern companies and construction utilize the opportunities of functional stairs to actually upgrade buildings. Large utilities such as banks as well as residential buildings such as penthouses (e.g. in St George Wharf Tower) have modern and luxurious installations.

Notable sets of stairs

The stairs are usually employee-only, but there is a public run called "Niesenlauf" once a year.
 Mount Girnar, one of the holiest of sacred places for Hindu, Jain, and Buddhist followers, and also for some Muslims, is located in Junagadh district in the Indian state of Gujarat in Saurashtrian peninsula. At a height of 1100 metres, with five summits, each adorned with several sacred places, it is accessed on foot by soaring close to 10,000 steps along a rugged terrain and deciduous forest that is also the last home for Asiatic lions. It is the longest completely stone-made stairway in the world.
 Alipiri, India, is one of two ways to reach the Sri Venkateswara Swami Vaari Temple, Tirumala from Tirupati on foot, and it was until recently the only one in modern times. The temple is the richest Hindu temple in the world in terms of donations received and wealth and is visited by about 50,000 to 100,000 pilgrims per day (30 to 40 million people annually on average), while on special occasions and festivals like the annual Brahmotsavam, the number of pilgrims shoots up to 500,000, making it the most-visited holy place in the world. Srivari Mettu, about 20 km away, is the original one that was renovated and brought back to use in 2008. Alipiri is the longer route with more than 3550 steps, Srivari Mettu is shorter with 2388 steps.
 A flight of 7,200 steps (including inner temple Steps), with 6,293 Official Mountain Walkway Steps, leads up the East Peak of Mount Tai in China.
 The Gemonian stairs were infamous as a place of execution during the early Roman Empire, especially during the period postdating Tiberius.
Originally used to access longwire radio antennas which were strung high above the Haiku Valley, between Honolulu and Kaneohe, they are closed to hikers.
It is a maintenance stairway for the water pipeline to the old Flørli hydro plant. The hydro plant is now closed down, and the stairs are open to the public. The stairway is claimed to be the longest wooden stairway in the world.
 The longest stone stairs in Japan are the 3,333-step stairs of the Shakain temple in Yatsushiro, Kumamoto. The second ones, Mount Haguro stone stairs, have 2,446 steps in Tsuruoka, Yamagata.
 The CN Tower's staircase reaches the main deck level after 1,776 steps and the Sky Pod above after 2,579 steps; it is the tallest metal staircase on Earth.
 The Penrose stairs, devised by Lionel and Roger Penrose, are a famous impossible object. The image distorts perspective in such a manner that the stairs appear to be never-ending, a physical impossibility. The image was adopted by M. C. Escher in his iconic lithograph Ascending and Descending.
 The World Trade Center Survivors' Staircase is the last visible structure above ground level at the World Trade Center site. It was originally two outdoor flights of granite-clad stairs and an escalator that connected Vesey Street to the World Trade Center's Austin J. Tobin Plaza. During the September 11, 2001, attacks, the stairs served as an escape route for hundreds of evacuees from 5 World Trade Center, a 9-floor building adjacent to the 110-story towers.
 Stairwell A was the lone stairway left intact after the second plane hit the South Tower of the World Trade Center during the September 11 attacks. It was believed to have remained intact until the South Tower collapsed at 9:59 am.  14 people were able to escape the floors located at the impact zone (including one man who saw the plane coming at him), and 4 people from the floors above the impact zone.  Numerous 911 operators who received calls from individuals inside the South Tower were not well informed of the situation as it rapidly unfolded in the South Tower.  Many operators told callers not to descend the tower on their own, even though it is now believed that Stairwell A was most likely passable at and above the point of impact.
 In London, England, a notable staircase is that to the Monument to the Great Fire of London, more commonly known simply as "the Monument". This is a column in the City of London, near the northern end of London Bridge, which commemorates the Great Fire of London. The top of the Monument is reached by a narrow winding staircase of 311 steps. Constructed between 1671 and 1677, it is the tallest isolated stone column in the world.
 The Spanish Steps in Rome are a monument of late Italian Baroque architecture connecting the Piazza di Spagna with the Trinità dei Monti up the side of the Pincian Hill. Designed by Francesco De Sanctis and constructed 1723–1725, the 135 steps form a wide vista looking down toward the Tiber. The steps are adorned with garden terraces blooming with azaleas and have been widely celebrated in cultural work.
 The Loretto Chapel in Santa Fe, New Mexico is well known for its helix-shaped spiral staircase, which has been nicknamed "Miraculous Stair". It has been the subject of legend and rumor, and the circumstances surrounding its construction and its builder are considered miraculous by the Sisters of Loretto and many visitors.
 The El Toro 20, a twenty-step set of stairs in Lake Forest, California, was well known among skateboarders, BMXers, and inline skaters as a popular and challenging skate spot. The first skateboarder to do an ollie down it was Don Nguyen. The staircase was demolished in 2019.
 The Grand Staircase of the Titanic is one of the most recognizable features of the British transatlantic ocean liner that sank on her maiden voyage in 1912 after a collision with an iceberg.
 Decorated stair risers were used extensively in the Greco-Buddhist art of Gandhara, to form the pedestal to small devotional stupas. They were usually adorned with friezes, fantastic animals and decorations. A flight of stairs with decorated stair risers from the Chakhil-i-Ghoundi Stupa has been almost fully restored and can now be seen at the Guimet Museum in Paris. Archaeological research by the Italian IsMEO at the Butkara Stupa suggests that small decorative stairs were adjoined to Buddhist stupas at the time of the Indo-Greek Kingdom, and that they were decorated with Buddhist scenes.

Gallery

See also

 Alley
 Cable railings
 Combination stair
 Equestrian staircase
 Fire escape
 Fish ladder
 Inclined plane
 Mule ramp
 Penrose stairs
 Rocky Steps
 Smokeproof enclosure
 Stair climbing
 Staircase tower
 Steel square (for use in stair framing)
 Steps of Cincinnati
 Steps of Pittsburgh
 Stoop (architecture)
 Watermen's stairs

References

External links

 Stair maps (public stairways mainly in North America)

 
.
Architectural elements
Building engineering
Floors
Garden features
Pedestrian infrastructure
Safety codes
Transport buildings and structures
Vertical transport devices